, commonly known as Nankatsu SC (南葛SC, Nankatsu Esu Shī) are a Japanese football club based in Katsushika, Tokyo. They play in the Kantō Soccer League. As the club aims for a future qualification to the J.League, they currently hold the J.League 100 Year Plan status.

History
The club's origin dates from 1983. In that era, the club mainly centered attention on Tokiwa Junior High School alumni who wanted to play for the club, inserting a certain influence on the club, which ended up naming themselves as Tokiwa Club. The club joined the Tokyo Adult Soccer League, and was promoted to its 2nd Division in 1994. The club repeatedly switched between the second and third division, as the club couldn't gain consistency in a higher-level league. In 2011, the Katsushika Ward Football Federation established the NPO International Football Promotion Association, which is an organization under the Federation for clubs aiming to join the J.League. The then named Tokiwa Club became an affiliate.

The club was renamed in 2012, becoming Katsushika Vitoard (葛飾ヴィトアード). In 2013, the club welcomed Yōichi Takahashi as the new president, renaming the club as Nankatsu SC, in allusion to his (Yōichi Takahashi's) globally famous manga and anime Captain Tsubasa, which attracted the attention of many young people in Japan, which culminated in an increasing rise of interest about football in the nation. They established an U-12 team for elementary school students in 2013, and an U-15 team for junior high school students on 2015. From 2015 to 2017, they signed partnerships with Nankatsu SC Fukuoka, SC Sagamihara, and CE Sabadell FC.

In January 2019, Nankatsu SC Co. Ltd was established to operate the first-team, transferring the team's management. In the following year, they were approved as a member of the J.League 100 Year Plan, alongside Vonds Ichihara, FC Osaka, Veertien Mie and Iwaki FC.

On 14 July 2021, Valuence Holdings acquired 33,5% of the Nankatsu SC Co. Ltd. shares (the other 66.5% remained owned by Yōichi Takahashi). In addition, Shinsuke Sakimoto, then Valuence Holdings CEO, became Nankatsu SC Co. Ltd. president. In the same year (2021), Nankatsu SC, who were then a newly promoted team from the Tokyo Metropolitan League, making at the time its regional debut, were promoted from the Kanto Soccer League 2nd division, finishing as 2021 runners-up. 

In the 2022 season, they played in the Kanto Soccer League 1st division, successfully avoiding relegation, despite being threatened by it several times during the league season. Nankatsu made their debut at the Shakaijin Cup on 2022. Their first match on the competition was a win against FC Tokushima by 1–0, after a tap-in goal by Deivisson gave them the win. Their second match was the debut's opposite, as this time they lost the match by 1-0 against Veroskronos Tsuno, early exiting the tournament at the Round of 16.

Players

Current squad

2023 season transfers
List of transfers for the 2023 season, updated for the last time on 31 January 2023.

Coaching Staff
.

League record

Honours
 Tokyo Metropolitan League (2): 2018, 2020
Kanto Soccer League (1): 2020

Nankatsu SC WINGS
The club has also a women's football section, under the name Nankatsu SC WINGS. It was founded on 2014. They started from Tokyo Metropolitan Women Football League's 5th division, but got three back-to-back promotions, then making their 1st division debut early on 2018. Earning promotion from the Metropolitan League, they entered the Kanto Soccer League on 2021, playing on the 2nd division. Another back-to-back promotion saw them jumping to the 1st division, starting from the 2022 season.

Nankatsu SC WINGS current squad

References

External links
Official Website  

Football clubs in Japan
Association football clubs established in 1983
Sports teams in Tokyo
1983 establishments in Japan